Chile at the 1928 Summer Olympics in Amsterdam, Netherlands was the nation's fifth appearance out of eight editions of the Summer Olympic Games. The all-male national team of 38 athletes competed in 22 events in 6 sports. This edition marked Chile's first Olympic medal in the silver category.

Medalists

Athletics

8 athletes, all men, represented Chile in 1928. It was the nation's 5th appearance in the sport, in which Chile had competed each time the nation appeared at the Games. Chile won its first Olympic medal—in any sport—when Manuel Plaza took silver in the men's marathon.

 Track and road events

 Field events

Boxing

4 boxers, all men, represented Chile in 1928. It was the nation's 2nd appearance in the sport. Díaz matched Chile's best ever finish in boxing, reaching the quarterfinals.

Cycling

Five cyclists (all in track), all men, represented Chile in 1928. It was the nation's 3rd appearance in the sport.

Track cycling

 Time trial

 Match races

Fencing

Six fencers, all men, represented Chile in 1928. It was the nation's 2nd appearance in the sport.

Football
;Summary

 Men's tournament

Chile competed in men's football for the first time in 1928. The team lost its first match against Portugal, 4–2, and were eliminated from the single-elimination tournament. Chile also played in a consolation tournament, defeating Mexico before playing the Netherlands to a full-time draw. After a coin toss the Netherlands were declared winners and were handed the trophy which had been on offer (by the NVB), but gave it to Chile to take home as a 'memento' of the Netherlands, the Olympic Games and their Dutch football friends.

Team roster

Preliminary round

Consolation tournament, First round

Consolation tournament, Final

Swimming

4 swimmers, all men, represented Chile in 1928. It was the nation's debut appearance in the sport.

References

External links
Official Olympic Reports
International Olympic Committee results database

Nations at the 1928 Summer Olympics
1928
Olymp